Herpetogramma okamotoi is a moth in the family Crambidae. It was described by Hiroshi Yamanaka in 1976. It is found on the Japanese islands of Honshu and Shikoku.

The larvae feed on the leaves Pteris multifida and Microlepia strigosa.

References

Moths described in 1976
Herpetogramma
Moths of Japan